Here are lists of some notable personalities associated with BDSM, arranged by field of activity. Some people may appear under more than one category.

Activists 
Patrick Califia
Viola Johnson
Jack McGeorge
Lord Morpheous
Desmond Ravenstone
Gayle Rubin
Cynthia Slater
Mollena Williams-Haas

Art 
Artists
Authors
Photographers

Bondage riggers 
Go Arisue
Matthias T. J. Grimme 
Jeff Gord
Lee Harrington
Seiu Ito
Irving Klaw
Randa Mai
Midori
Jay Wiseman

Dominatrices 
Asa Akira
Charlotte Bach
CoCo Brown
Tabitha Fringe Chase
Melissa Febos
Leslie Fish
Mistress Matisse
Domenica Niehoff
Eva Norvind

Models 
Dana DeArmond
Sharon Kane
Eri Kikuchi
Lorelei Lee
Bettie Page
Princess Donna
Madison Young

Notable BDSM video directors

 Jeff Gord (of House of Gord and Naked Gord)
 Peter Acworth (of Kink.com and Public Disgrace)

Nikkatsu SM Queens 
Junko Mabuki
Ran Masaki
Nami Matsukawa
Izumi Shima
Miki Takakura
Naomi Tani

See also
Significant BDSM people
BDSM in culture and media

References

 
BDSM